Rufino Ortega (August 22, 1847 - November 20, 1917) was an Argentine military man and politician.

Governors of Mendoza Province
1847 births
1917 deaths
People from Mendoza, Argentina
Argentine generals
Argentine people of Spanish descent